Halang is an urban barangay in Calamba, Laguna, Philippines.  It is situated in the east portion of the city (Calamba). Halang is the one of the richest barangays in Calamba.

Neighboring Barangays

Population

See also
 Jeric Gonzales
 Thea Tolentino

Gallery

References

Barangays of Calamba, Laguna